Northboro is a city in Page County, Iowa, United States. The population was 52 at the time of the 2020 census.

History
Northboro was platted in 1881, shortly after the railroad arrived into the neighborhood. It was hit by a large F4 tornado on April 5, 1954, injuring two.

Geography
Northboro is located at  (40.607696, -95.291476).

Demographics

2010 census
As of the census of 2010, there were 58 people, 25 households, and 17 families living in the city. The racial makeup of the city was 100.0% White. Hispanic or Latino of any race were 3.4% of the population.

There were 25 households, of which 20.0% had children under the age of 18 living with them, 60.0% were married couples living together, 8.0% had a female householder with no husband present, and 32.0% were non-families. 28.0% of all households were made up of individuals, and 8% had someone living alone who was 65 years of age or older. The average household size was 2.32 and the average family size was 2.88.

The median age in the city was 46 years. 15.5% of residents were under the age of 18; 7% were between the ages of 18 and 24; 25.8% were from 25 to 44; 41.3% were from 45 to 64; and 10.3% were 65 years of age or older. The gender makeup of the city was 55.2% male and 44.8% female.

2000 census
As of the census of 2000, there were 60 people, 25 households, and 19 families living in the city. The racial makeup of the city was 98.33% White, and 1.67% from two or more races.

There were 25 households, out of which 28.0% had children under the age of 18 living with them, 68.0% were married couples living together, 8.0% had a female householder with no husband present, and 24.0% were non-families. 24.0% of all households were made up of individuals, and 20.0% had someone living alone who was 65 years of age or older. The average household size was 2.40 and the average family size was 2.79.

15.0% are under the age of 18, 16.7% from 18 to 24, 21.7% from 25 to 44, 25.0% from 45 to 64, and 21.7% who were 65 years of age or older. The median age was 44 years. For every 100 females, there were 100.0 males. For every 100 females age 18 and over, there were 96.2 males.

The median income for a household in the city was $35,536, and the median income for a family was $36,429. Males had a median income of $22,500 versus $25,625 for females. The per capita income for the city was $15,360. There were no families and 1.5% of the population living below the poverty line, including no under eighteens and none of those over 64.

Education
Northboro is within the Shenandoah Community School District.

References

Cities in Page County, Iowa
Cities in Iowa